Julie Delpy is the debut album by actress/musician Julie Delpy. Delpy wrote and produced all 12 songs on the album.

"A Waltz for a Night", "An Ocean Apart" and "Je t'aime tant" were featured in the film Before Sunset, which starred Delpy and Ethan Hawke.

Track listing
All music and lyrics composed by Julie Delpy; except where indicated
 "My Dear Friend" - 3:15
 "Mr Unhappy" - 3:22
 "Lame Love" (music by Marouan Jamai and Mike Meeker) - 4:09
 "Ready to Go" - 4:30
 "Je t'aime tant" - 3:51
 "Something a Bit Vague" - 3:18
 "Black & Gray" - 4:45
 "A Waltz for a Night" - 3:30
 "She Don't Care" - 4:20
 "And Together" - 3:41
 "An Ocean Apart" - 4:01
 "Time to Wake Up" - 3:16

References

2003 debut albums
Julie Delpy albums
Albums produced by Philippe Eidel